The 3.7 cm Flak auf Fahrgestell Panzerkampfwagen IV (sf) (Sd.Kfz. 161/3), nicknamed Möbelwagen ("Moving Van") because of its boxy shape, was a self-propelled anti-aircraft gun built from the chassis of the Panzer IV tank. It was used by the Wehrmacht in the European Theatre of World War II.

In 1943, due to the waning ability of the Luftwaffe to combat enemy ground-attack aircraft, ground-based anti-aircraft weaponry was becoming increasingly important to the Wehrmacht. In early 1943, the idea of creating a gun platform on the chassis of the Panzer IV was first proposed. The prototype displayed to Hitler on December 7, 1943, used the 2 cm Flakvierling 38, which was deemed too weak for the latest aircraft, which were constantly being improved to fly higher and faster. Only a single prototype with this gun was produced before the design was rejected. A second design with an upgraded single 3.7 cm Flak 43 L/89 was approved as a temporary stopgap until better Flakpanzers could be created. 240 Möbelwagens were built, and the first production models were put into service on the Western Front in April 1944.

The Möbelwagen was built on Panzer IV chassis that had been damaged on the Eastern Front and returned to the factory for repair. These were fitted with an open-top superstructure that provided the gun mount. Around this, four hinged 20 mm armored plates were placed.  These plates had two operating positions: they could be lowered for full 360 degree traverse, allowing flat or low-level firing, or they could be half-closed, being pinned together to hang slightly open. In this position, they had notches that allowed the gun full rotation, but only for firing at airborne targets. Still, both of these positions left the crew extremely vulnerable. The fully closed position was only used for transport, when the plates would give the crew some protection from small arms fire and shrapnel.

Though the Möbelwagen was intended to be a stopgap, it served the anti-aircraft platoons of the Panzer Divisions on the Western Front. Only 240 were produced, and it was eventually succeeded by the first true Flakpanzers: Wirbelwind and Ostwind, both of which provided the crew with improved armored protection and full rotation when firing at either ground or air targets.

Comparable vehicles
 40M Nimród
 Ostwind
 M19 Multiple Gun Motor Carriage
 Crusader Mk. III Anti-Aircraft Tank Mk. I
 ZSU-37

References

External links
 Information about the Möbelwagen at Panzerworld
Mobelwagen at Military History Encyclopedia
 Surviving Panzer IV variants - A PDF file presenting the Panzer IV variants (Jagdpanzer IV, Hummel, Nashorn, Brummbär, StuG IV, Flakpanzer tanks and prototypes based on Pz IV) still existing in the world

World War II self-propelled anti-aircraft weapons of Germany
Military vehicles introduced from 1940 to 1944
de:Flakpanzer IV#Möbelwagen
fr:Flakpanzer IV#Flakpanzer IV Möbelwagen